Thanet West was a British parliamentary constituency in the Isle of Thanet, in Kent.

It was created for the February 1974 general election, when the former constituency of Isle of Thanet was split in two, and returned one Member of Parliament (MP)  to the House of Commons of the Parliament of the United Kingdom. It was abolished for the 1983 general election, when Thanet West and the neighbouring Thanet East constituency were replaced by new North Thanet and South Thanet constituencies.

Boundaries
The Borough of Margate, and in the Rural District of Eastry the parishes of Acol, Minster, Monkton, St Nicholas at Wade, and Sarre.

Members of Parliament

Election results

References

Thanet
Parliamentary constituencies in Kent (historic)
Constituencies of the Parliament of the United Kingdom established in 1974
Constituencies of the Parliament of the United Kingdom disestablished in 1983